Robert Edward Grossman  (born September 16, 1989) is an American professional baseball outfielder for the Texas Rangers of Major League Baseball (MLB). He has previously played in MLB for the Houston Astros, Minnesota Twins, Oakland Athletics, Detroit Tigers and Atlanta Braves. After attending high school in Texas, Grossman was drafted by the Pittsburgh Pirates in the sixth round in 2008. He made his MLB debut with the Astros in 2013.

Early life
Grossman was born in San Diego, California, but grew up in Cypress, Texas, where he played four seasons of varsity baseball at Cy-Fair High School between 2005 and 2008. He was a first-team all-district selection as a freshman. In his junior season, the team won the 5A state baseball championship. "He was fun to coach because he worked very hard at practice and looked like he was having the time of his life playing the game. We knew early on as a coaching staff that he was a special player," said a former high school coach, John Pope.

Professional career

Minors
Considered a possible first round pick, Grossman fell in the 2008 Major League Baseball Draft due to his commitment to attend the University of Texas. However, the Pirates selected Grossman in the sixth round of the draft and signed him for an above slot $1 million signing bonus.

In 2010, Grossman played for the Bradenton Marauders of the High-A Florida State League (FSL). In 2011, again playing for the Marauders, Grossman became the first minor league player since Nick Swisher in 2004 to score 100 runs and walk 100 times in a season; he also became the first player in the FSL to do so since 1998. He was named Minor League Player of the Year for the Pittsburgh organization.

Kevin Goldstein of Baseball Prospectus ranked Grossman as the 76th best prospect in baseball before the 2012 season. The Pirates invited Grossman to spring training in 2012. On July 24, 2012, the Pirates traded him to the Houston Astros along with Rudy Owens and Colton Cain for Wandy Rodríguez. Between Pittsburgh's Double-A affiliate, the Altoona Curve of the Eastern League, and Houston's Double-A team, the Corpus Christi Hooks of the Texas League, Grossman hit .266 with 10 home runs in 131 games.

Houston Astros

The Astros promoted Grossman to the major leagues on April 24, 2013, he batted leadoff in his debut. He split time that year between the Oklahoma City Redhawks of the Triple-A Pacific Coast League and the Astros. At one point, Grossman hit safely in 13 consecutive games, a team high that year.

Grossman played in 103 games for the Astros in 2014, hitting for a .233 batting average, six home runs and 37 runs batted in (RBI).

After spending much of the 2015 season in the minors, he was released by the Astros after the 2015 season.

Minnesota Twins

On December 11, 2015, Grossman signed a minor league contract with the Cleveland Indians, receiving a non-roster invitation to spring training. He opted out of his contract on May 16, 2016 and signed with the Minnesota Twins. The Twins promoted him to the major leagues on May 19, and he hit a home run in his first game with the Twins on May 20. He split time among the outfield and DH. He appeared in 99 games for the Twins, setting career highs in home runs, average, walks and runs scored. In 2017, he established himself as a regular in the Twins’ lineup, playing in a career-high 119 games despite missing a few weeks with a thumb fracture, hitting .246 with 9 HR and 45 RBI.

In 2018, Grossman began the season as the Twins' designated hitter. He played in a career-high 129 games, hitting .273 with 5 home runs and 48 RBIs. On November 30, 2018, the Twins non-tendered him and he became a free agent.

Oakland Athletics
On February 15, 2019, Grossman signed a one-year deal with the Oakland Athletics. Grossman did not perform as he did the previous season, as he hit just .240 with 6 home runs and 38 RBI in 138 games.

Detroit Tigers
On January 5, 2021, Grossman signed a two-year, $10 million contract with the Detroit Tigers. On May 28, Grossman hit his first career walk-off home run against Justin Wilson to give the Tigers a 3–2 extra innings win over the New York Yankees. While hitting .239 for the 2021 season, Grossman had a career-high 98 walks (fourth in the AL) for a solid .357 on-base percentage. He posted numerous other career highs, including at-bats (557), home runs (23), RBI (67) and stolen bases (20). He became the seventh player in Tigers franchise history to post a season of 20+ home runs and 20+ stolen bases.

On May 10, 2022, Grossman set a new MLB all-time record for position players with 401 consecutive games without an error. On July 10, Grossman’s errorless streak ended at 440, after he dropped a pop up off of the bat of Chicago White Sox outfielder Luis Robert. In 83 games with Detroit in 2022, Grossman hit .205/.313/.282 with 2 home runs, 23 RBI, and 3 stolen bases.

Atlanta Braves
On August 1, 2022, Grossman was traded to the Atlanta Braves for pitcher Kris Anglin. He played in 46 games for the Braves down the stretch, batting .217/.306/.370 with 5 home runs, 22 RBI, and 3 stolen bases. He became a free agent following the season.

Texas Rangers
On February 17, 2023, Grossman signed a one-year contract with the Texas Rangers. The Rangers entered the 2023 season with plans to use Grossman as the primary left fielder over Josh Smith and Brad Miller.

References

External links

1989 births
Living people
Sportspeople from Harris County, Texas
Baseball players from Texas
Major League Baseball left fielders
Houston Astros players
Minnesota Twins players
Oakland Athletics players
Detroit Tigers players
Atlanta Braves players
Gulf Coast Pirates players
West Virginia Power players
Bradenton Marauders players
Altoona Curve players
Corpus Christi Hooks players
Oklahoma City RedHawks players
Mesa Solar Sox players
Fresno Grizzlies players
Cangrejeros de Santurce (baseball) players
Columbus Clippers players
Rochester Red Wings players
Liga de Béisbol Profesional Roberto Clemente outfielders